Cocytia is a genus of moths in the family Erebidae. It is monotypic, being represented by the single species, Cocytia durvillii, an uncommon day-flying moth found in lowland areas of the Moluccas, Aru, and New Guinea. The species has clear wings bordered with black, with an orange patch at the base of each forewing and long antennae, thicker at the outer end. Both the genus and species were first described by Jean Baptiste Boisduval in 1828.

Subspecies
Cocytia durvillii durvillii (Papua New Guinea)
Cocytia durvillii chlorosoma Butler, 1875 (Aru)
Cocytia durvillii aurantiaca Rothschild, 1897 (Tenimber)
Cocytia durvillii ribbei Druce, 1884 (Aru)
Cocytia durvillii veitschi Butler, 1884 (Batchian)

References

 
Cocytiini
Moths described in 1828
Monotypic moth genera